Han Zhiqing (August 1958 – 5 November 2022) was a major general of the People's Liberation Army (PLA) of China and the head of Logistics Support Department of the PLA Ground Force.

Biography
Han was born in Linqing, Shandong, in August 1958. He joined the People's Liberation Army (PLA) in December 1976, and joined the Communist Party of China in 1978. He was a graduate student of the PLA National Defence University and the Military Academy of the General Staff of the Armed Forces of Russia.

Han died on 5 November 2022, at the age of 64.

Career 
He commanded the Neichangshan Fortress Command in Jinan Military Region from August 2006 to March 2008.

He served as Chief of Staff of 26th Army in April 2008, and held that office until December 2010, when he was promoted to Deputy Army Commander.

In July 2009, by executive Order of the Chairman of the Central Military Commission, he was awarded the military rank of major general.

In March 2013, he was appointed Deputy Chief of Staff of the East Sea Fleet, and served until March 2014. Then he rose to become head of Joint Logistics Department of the Jinan Military Region.

In December 2015, he was appointed head of Logistics Support Department of the PLA Ground Force.

Han was a delegate to the 11th National People's Congress.

Book
 Military Research and Thinking

References

1958 births
2022 deaths
People from Linqing
People's Liberation Army generals from Shandong
PLA National Defence University alumni
Delegates to the 11th National People's Congress
Military Academy of the General Staff of the Armed Forces of Russia alumni